Ravago is a Belgian plastic producing company with its headquarters located in Luxembourg. The company is active in polymer and chemical distribution, building materials, recycling and compounding of plastic and elastomeric raw materials. Theodoros Roussis is the chief executive officer of the company.

In the United States, Ravago has six main subsidiary companies: Amco, Channel Prime Alliance, Entec, Muehlstein, Ravago Chemicals North America (RCNA) and Ravago Manufacturing Americas. Ravago has plastic compounding facilities in the United States located in Pennsylvania, Michigan, Ohio, Tennessee, and Texas.

History
On 25 April 1961, the company was founded by Raf Van Gorp and in 1965 he bought the premises of his former employer, a dynamite company (PRB: Poudre Reunion d'Arendonk, Belgique) in Arendonk.

Operations
Today, the Ravago group represents over 6,600,000 metric tons of annual polymer sales serving more than 50,000 active customers through 325+ locations across more than 55+ countries worldwide. Ravago’s production competence consists of 45+ manufacturing facilities of which 19 recycling and compounding plants in North America, Europe, Asia and Africa with a combined annual capacity of over 775,000 metric tons; 13 production plants in Europe that are offering finished products for the building sector and 7 plants and 6 application laboratories for the Chemicals business.

External links
 Ravago
 Amco Polymers
 Channel Prime Alliance
 Entec Polymers
 Ravago Chemicals North America
 Ravago Manufacturing Americas

Sources
 Ravago: Facts & Figures

References

Companies based in Antwerp Province
Arendonk